Esreboxetine (developmental code names AXS-14, PNU-165442G) is a selective norepinephrine reuptake inhibitor which was under development by Pfizer for the treatment of neuropathic pain and fibromyalgia but failed to show significant benefit over currently available medications and was discontinued. It is the (S,S)-(+)-enantiomer of reboxetine and is even more selective as a norepinephrine reuptake inhibitor in comparison.

However, recently it has been found that esreboxetine could be effective in fibromyalgia patients.

References

Enantiopure drugs
Morpholines
Norepinephrine reuptake inhibitors
Pfizer brands
Phenol ethers